Dead Flowers may refer to:
"Dead Flowers" (Rolling Stones song)
"Dead Flowers" (Miranda Lambert song)
Dead Flowers – EP, by Miranda Lambert
Dead Flowerz, an album by Esham